Albert Beier (28 September 1900 – 21 September 1972) was a German footballer. He was a physically inclined, robustly built player.

Beier was born in Lokstedt, and started his footballing career at Eintracht Lokstedt, before moving to FC Union 1903 Altona and Hamburger SV. His first success came with a North German championship victory. He also reached the German championship final against 1. FC Nürnberg. After to draws, Hamburg was awarded the title, but renounced it.

In 1922, he also won the North German championship title after victories against Union Oberschöneweide and won the 1923 German championship. In the 1923–24 season, he became victorious for a third time in a row with Hamburg in North German championship, but he lost in the championship final match against Nürnberg.

He played his first international match on 14 December 1924 against Switzerland, a 1–1 stalemate. He achieved eleven caps in total for the national team. In 1925, he won the North German championship for a fourth time with Hamburg, but, with Beier suffering with injuries part of the way through the season, other domestic competitions were out of Hamburg's reach.

He played in two federal cup finals in 1927 and 1928 and he also played in the Olympic football tournament in 1928.

References

External links
 
 

German footballers
Germany international footballers
1900 births
1972 deaths
Olympic footballers of Germany
Footballers at the 1928 Summer Olympics
Hamburger SV players
Association football defenders
German footballers needing infoboxes